Young-sook, also spelled Yong-suk, is a Korean feminine given name. Its meaning differs based on the hanja used to write each syllable of the name. There are 75 hanja with the reading "young" and 13 hanja with the reading "sook" on the South Korean government's official list of hanja which may be registered for use in given names. Names starting with "Young" were popular for South Korean babies of both sexes born in the 1940s and 1950s, and Young-sook was the most common of these for baby girls. In 2012, there were more than forty thousand South Koreans with the name Kim Young-sook, making it the most common full name in the country.

People with this name include:

Artists and writers
Han Young-suk (1920–1990), South Korean traditional dancer
Kang Young-sook (born 1967), South Korean writer

Sportspeople
Kim Young-sook (born 1965), South Korean field hockey player
Yun Young-sook (born 1971), South Korean archer
Huh Young-sook (born 1975), South Korean handball player 
Kim Yong-suk (born 1979), North Korean figure skater
Jo Yong-suk (born 1988), North Korean sport shooter
Park Young-sook (born 1988), South Korean table tennis player

Others
Kim Young-sook (born 1947), first wife of North Korean leader Kim Jong-il
Kim Young-sook, stage name Maya (singer) (born 1979), South Korean singer

References

Korean feminine given names